Lessepsian migrants, named after Ferdinand de Lesseps, the French engineer in charge of the Suez Canal's construction, are marine species that are native to the waters on one side of the Suez Canal, and which have been introduced by passage through the canal to the waters on its other side, giving rise to new colonies there and often becoming invasive.

Most Lessepsian migrations are of Red Sea species invading the Mediterranean Sea; few occur in the opposite direction.

Some examples of Red Sea species to Mediterranean Sea
The year given denotes the first record in the Mediterranean (often distinct from the year of publication).

Mediterranean species to Red Sea
 Argyrosomus regius 
 Biuve fulvipunctata 
 Gobius cobitis 
 Gobius paganellus 
 Serranus cabrilla 
 Solea aegyptiaca 
 Umbrina cirrosa

References

General references

Dulcic, J. and A. Pallaoro (2003). Lessepsian Fish Migrants Reported in the East Adriatic Sea: An Annotated List, Ser. hist. nat..
Golani, D. (1998). Impact of Red Sea Fish Migrants through the Suez Canal on the Aquatic Environment of the Eastern Mediterranean, Yale FE&S Bulletin 103.

External links

Lessepsian Migrants
Suez Canal
Fish migrations